The 1938 All-Pacific Coast football team consists of American football players chosen by various organizations for All-Pacific Coast teams for the 1938 college football season.  The organizations selecting teams in 1938 included the Associated Press (AP), the International News Service (INS), and the United Press (UP).

The USC Trojans won the Pacific Coast Conference (PCC) championship, compiled a 9–2 record, were ranked #7 in the final AP Poll, and were represented by three players on the first teams selected by AP, INS, or UP. The USC honorees were quarterback Grenny Lansdell (AP, INS, UP), guard Harry Smith (AP, INS, UP), and halfback Bob Hoffman (UP).

California finished second in the PCC with a 10–1 record, were ranked #14 in the final AP Poll, and placed four players on the AP, INS or UP first teams. The UCLA honorees were halfback Vic Bottari (AP, INS, UP), fullback Dave Anderson (AP, INS, UP), end Will Dolman (INS), and tackle Dave De Varona (AP, INS, UP).

Only one player from a team outside the PCC received first-team honors. Tackle Alvord Wolff of the Santa Clara Broncos won first-team honors from the AP, INS, and UP.

All-Pacific Coast selections

Quarterback
 Grenny Lansdell, USC (AP-1; INS-1; UP-1 [back])

Halfbacks
 Vic Bottari, California (AP-1; INS-1; UP-1 [back]) (College Football hall of Fame)
 Kenny Washington, UCLA (AP-1; INS-1)
 Bob Hoffman, USC (UP-1 [back])

Fullback
 Dave Anderson, California (AP-1; INS-1; UP-1 [back])

Ends
 Joe Wendlick, Oregon State (AP-1; INS-1; UP-1)
 Jay MacDowell, Washington (AP-1; UP-1)
 Willard "Will" Dolman, California (INS-1)

Tackles
 Dave De Varona, California (AP-1; INS-1; UP-1)
 Alvord Wolff, Santa Clara (AP-1; INS-1; UP-1)

Guards
 Harry Smith, USC (AP-1; INS-1; UP-1) (College Football Hall of Fame)
 Art Means, Washington (AP-1)
 Steve Slivinski, Washington (INS-1)
 Prescott Hutchins, Oregon State (UP-1)

Centers
 John Ryland, UCLA (AP-1; INS-1; UP-1)

Key

AP = Associated Press

INS = International News Service

UP = United Press

See also
1938 College Football All-America Team

References

All-Pacific Coast Football Team
All-Pacific Coast football teams
All-Pac-12 Conference football teams